The 2022 Italian motorcycle Grand Prix (officially known as the Gran Premio d'Italia Oakley) was the eighth round of the 2022 Grand Prix motorcycle racing season and the third round of the 2022 MotoE World Cup. All races (except MotoE race 1 which was held on 28 May) were held at the Autodromo Internazionale del Mugello in Scarperia e San Piero on 29 May 2022. The Grand Prix saw the retirement of Valentino Rossi's racing number 46 in the MotoGP class.

Background

Riders' entries 
In MotoGP, in addition to the starting riders, there are two riders as wildcards: Lorenzo Savadori with Aprilia Racing for the third time this season after the Grand Prix in Portugal and Spain, and Michele Pirro, at the first with Aruba.it Ducati. In Moto2, Mattia Pasini races as a wildcard for the Gas Gas Aspar Team, while Keminth Kubo returns as a starter to the Yamaha VR46 Master Camp Team after recovering from his injury. In Moto3, David Muñoz makes his debut this season in Boé SKX after he was replaced by Gerard Riu because he had not turned 16 years, the minimum limit to participate in the championship. Alberto Surra returns to racing in the Rivacold Snipers Team after recovering from the injury due to the crash in the Grand Prix of the Americas.

MotoGP Championship standings before the race 
After the French Grand Prix, Fabio Quartararo confirms his leadership in the drivers' standings with 102 points, 4 more than Aleix Espargaró and 8 more than Enea Bastianini (winner at Le Mans). Álex Rins is fourth with 69 points, followed by Jack Miller (who gains six positions in the standings) and Johann Zarco with 62 points. Ducati is first in the constructors' classification with 156 points, with a large margin over the others: Yamaha (106), Aprilia (99), KTM (84) overtaking Suzuki (80), and Honda finishing with 80 points. In the team standings, Aprilia Racing overtakes the Suzuki Ecstar Team in command (131 points the first, 125 points the second), with Monster Energy Yamaha MotoGP third at 121 points, 3 more than Ducati Lenovo Team. Red Bull KTM Factory Racing is fifth with 99 points.

Moto2 Championship standings before the race 
In the riders' classification, Celestino Vietti is first with 108 points, followed by Ai Ogura (92 points), Arón Canet (89 points), Tony Arbolino (70 points) and Augusto Fernández (winner of the previous race, 69 points). The constructors' classification states: Kalex 175 points, Boscoscuro 20 points, MV Agusta 5 points. In the constructors' standings, Idemitsu Honda Team Asia leads with 153 points, with a 12-point lead over the Flexbox HP40. Mooney VR46 Racing Team overtakes Elf Marc VDS Racing Team in third position (108 points the first, 3 less the second), Red Bull KTM Ajo is fifth with 89 points.

Moto3 Championship standings before the race 
Sergio García leads the riders' classification with 112 points, 17 points ahead of Jaumè Masia (winner in France) and Dennis Foggia, 23 points ahead of Izan Guevara and 37 points ahead of Ayumu Sasaki. In the manufacturers' classification, behind the leader Gas Gas (140 points), KTM (123 points) overtakes Honda (116 points). Husqvarna and CFMoto are fourth and fifth with 86 and 71 points respectively. Gas Gas Aspar Team dominates the team classification with 201 points; second is Leopard Racing with 133 points, 10 more than Red Bull KTM Ajo. In fourth position, Sterilgarda Husqvarna Max overtakes CFMoto Racing Prüstel GP by only one point (90 vs 89 points).

MotoE Cup standings before the race 
Dominique Aegerter overtakes Eric Granado at the head of the standings: the Swiss rider has 78 points, while the Brazilian rider has 70 points. Third is Mattia Casadei with 61 points, followed by Matteo Ferrari and Hikari Okubo with 48 and 47 points respectively.

Free practice

MotoGP
The top ten riders (written in bold) qualified in Q2.

Moto2

The top fourteen riders (written in bold) qualified in Q2.

Moto3
The top fourteen riders (written in bold) qualified in Q2.

MotoE 
In the first session, Dominique Aegerter was the fastest, ahead of Eric Granado and Kevin Zannoni. In the second, Aegerter once again was fastest in free practice ahead of Granado and Miquel Pons.

The top eight riders (written in bold) qualified in Q2.

Moto3

MotoE

Race

MotoGP

Moto2

 Gabriel Rodrigo withdrew from the event after Sunday warm-up due to persistent shoulder pain.

Moto3

 Ayumu Sasaki suffered two broken collarbones in a crash during practice & withdrew from the event.
 Alberto Surra suffered a broken metatarsal bone in a crash during practice and was declared unfit to compete.

MotoE

Race 1 

All bikes manufactured by Energica.

Race 2 

All bikes manufactured by Energica.

Notes:
 - Marc Alcoba, Niccolo Canepa and Eric Granado all were demoted due to ignoring yellow flags.

Championship standings after the race
Below are the standings for the top five riders, constructors, and teams after the round.

MotoGP

Riders' Championship standings

Constructors' Championship standings

Teams' Championship standings

Moto2

Riders' Championship standings

Constructors' Championship standings

Teams' Championship standings

Moto3

Riders' Championship standings

Constructors' Championship standings

Teams' Championship standings

MotoE

References

External links

2022 MotoGP race reports
motorcycle Grand Prix
2022
motorcycle Grand Prix